The 1985 Irish local elections were held in all the counties, cities and towns of Ireland on Thursday, 20 June 1985.

Results

County, city and town council seats

 "Waterford People's Party" was a local splinter from the Worker's Party. This election was the only election it ever contested as a separate entity, as it subsequent rejoined the Worker's Party.

County and City Councils

County councils

City councils

Town councils

References

Sources

Citations

See also 
Local government in the Republic of Ireland
:Category:Irish local government councils

 
1985 in Irish politics
1985
June 1985 events in Europe
Local elections